Polyipnus omphus is a species of ray-finned fish in the genus Polyipnus. It is found in the Western and Central Pacific and lives below 200 m.

References

Fish described in 1971
Sternoptychidae